Drahenický Málkov is a village in the district of Strakonice, in the South Bohemian Region, the Czech Republic. It is located about 5.5 km north of the town of Blatná. There are 68 addresses registered in the village. As of 2011, the village had a population of 78.

History 
The first written mention of the village dates back to 1454.

Gallery

References

External links 
 
 Website of volunteer firefighters from Drahenický Málkov

Villages in Strakonice District